Sam Berry may refer to:
 R. J. Berry (1934–2018), known as Sam, British geneticist, naturalist and Christian theorist
 Sam Berry (footballer) (born 2002), Australian rules footballer

See also
 S. Stillman Berry (Samuel Stillman Berry, 1887–1984), American marine zoologist